Leticia Suárez (born 10 February 1969) is a Cuban table tennis player. She competed in the women's doubles event at the 2000 Summer Olympics.

References

1969 births
Living people
Cuban female table tennis players
Olympic table tennis players of Cuba
Table tennis players at the 2000 Summer Olympics
Place of birth missing (living people)
Pan American Games medalists in table tennis
Pan American Games silver medalists for Cuba
Table tennis players at the 1991 Pan American Games
Medalists at the 1991 Pan American Games
20th-century Cuban women